Anwar Ibraheem may refer to:
Anouar Brahem, Tunisian musician
Anwar Ibrahim, Malaysian politician